Hydrokenoelsmoreite is a hydrous tungsten oxide mineral with formula □2W2O6(H2O). Hydrokenoelsmoreite is a colorless to white, translucent isometric mineral. It has a Mohs hardness of 3, exhibits no cleavage and has a splintery fracture. It has a vitreous to adamantine luster. It is optically isotropic with an index of refraction of n = 2.24.

It forms from the oxidation of ferberite within granitic pegmatite dykes and in pegmatitic greisen veins. It has a structure based on a defect pyrochlore lattice (A2B2O6O’).

It was first described for an occurrence in Elsmore Hill, New South Wales, Australia from where it takes its name.

References

Williams, P.A., Leverett, P., Sharpe, J.L., Colchester, D.M. (2005): Elsmoreite, cubic WO3•0.5H2O, a new mineral species from Elsmore, New South Wales, Australia. Canadian Mineralogist, 43, 1061-1064
American Mineralogist, volume 91, pages 216–224, 2006.

Atencio, D., Andrade, M. B., Christy, A. G., Gieré, R., & Kartashov, P. M. (2010). The pyrochlore supergroup of minerals: nomenclature. The Canadian Mineralogist, 48(3), 673–698.doi: 10.3749/canmin.48.3.673

Oxide minerals
Tungsten minerals
Cubic minerals
Minerals in space group 227